Navesink is an unincorporated community and census-designated place (CDP) located on the northernmost stretch of the Jersey Shore in Middletown Township in Monmouth County, in the U.S. state of New Jersey. As of the 2020 United States census, the CDP's population was 2,004, reflecting a decrease of 16 (-0.8%) from thd 2,020 residents enumerated at the 2010 U.S. census.

Geography

According to the U.S. Census Bureau, Navesink had a total area of 0.896 square miles (2.321 km2), including 0.885 square miles (2.291 km2) of land and 0.011 square miles (0.030 km2) of water (1.27%).

Demographics

2010 census

2000 census
As of the 2000 United States census, there were 1,962 people, 623 households, and 497 families living in the CDP. The population density was 2,178.8 people per square mile (841.7/km2). There were 647 housing units at an average density of 718.5/sq mi (277.6/km2). The racial makeup of the CDP was 84.20% White, 12.03% African American, 0.25% Native American, 1.38% Asian, 0.05% Pacific Islander, 0.56% from other races, and 1.53% from two or more races. Hispanic or Latino of any race were 2.55% of the population.

There were 623 households, out of which 39.5% had children under the age of 18 living with them, 64.4% were married couples living together, 12.0% had a female householder with no husband present, and 20.1% were non-families. 14.8% of all households were made up of individuals, and 5.1% had someone living alone who was 65 years of age or older. The average household size was 2.93 and the average family size was 3.26.

The population was spread out, with 26.2% under the age of 18, 4.9% from 18 to 24, 29.2% from 25 to 44, 25.2% from 45 to 64, and 14.5% who were 65 years of age or older. The median age was 40 years. For every 100 females, there were 94.4 males. For every 100 females age 18 and over, there were 87.6 males.

The median income for a household in the CDP was $81,456, and the median income for a family was $86,865. Males had a median income of $56,786 versus $40,833 for females. The per capita income for the CDP was $27,673. None of the families and 1.6% of the population were living below the poverty line, including no under eighteens and 8.5% of those over 64.

Historic district

The Navesink Historic District is a historic district located along both sides of Monmouth and Locust Avenues to the junction with Hillside and Grand Avenues. The district was added to the National Register of Historic Places on September 5, 1975, for its significance in commerce.

Local attractions
In 1841, Navesink became the site of the first lighthouse in the United States to be equipped with a Fresnel lens.

Transportation
New Jersey Transit offers local bus service on the 834 route. Major roads in Navesink include NJ Route 36 and County Route 516, both of which clip the northern end of Navesink's limits.

Notable people

People who were born in, residents of, or otherwise closely associated with Navesink include:
 Tom Hanson (1907-1970), football halfback in the National Football League, mainly for the Philadelphia Eagles, for whom he caught the first touchdown in franchise history.
 Richard Scudder (1913-2012), newspaper pioneer and co-founder of the MediaNews Group.
 William Strickland (1788–1854), pioneering architect and civil engineer.

References

External links
 

Census-designated places in Monmouth County, New Jersey
Historic districts on the National Register of Historic Places in New Jersey
Middletown Township, New Jersey
National Register of Historic Places in Monmouth County, New Jersey
New Jersey Register of Historic Places